Dodo or DoDo is a nickname for:


Footballers
 Dodô (footballer, born 1974), Brazilian retired footballer Ricardo Lucas Figueredo Monte Raso
 Dodô (footballer, born June 1987), Brazilian footballer Sandro Ferreira André Nascimento
 Dodô (footballer, born October 1987), Brazilian footballer Luiz Paulo Hilário
 Dodô (footballer, born 1990), Brazilian footballer Douglas Maradona Campos Dangui
 Dodô (footballer, born 1992), Brazilian footballer José Rodolfo Pires Ribeiro
 Dodô (footballer, born 1994), Brazilian footballer Raphael Guimarães de Paula
 Dodô (footballer, born 1998), Brazilian footballer Domilson Cordeiro dos Santos
 Dodô (footballer, born 2000), Brazilian footballer Paulo Henrique Athanazio
 Youssef Mohamad (born 1980), also known as Dodo, Lebanese footballer

Actors and directors
 Dodo Abashidze (1924–1990), Soviet Georgian film actor and director
 Nora Denney (1927–2005), American actress
 Dodo Watts (1910–1990), British film actress

Other
 Frank Bird (1869–1958), American Major League Baseball catcher briefly in 1892
 Lewis Carroll (1832–1898), English writer
 Carol Cheng (born 1957), Hong Kong artist
 Doris Große (1884–?), German artists' model
 Dodo Marmarosa (1925–2002), American jazz pianist

See also 
 
 

Lists of people by nickname